State Route 114 (SR 114) is a  state highway in the southwestern part of the U.S. state of Alabama. The eastern terminus of the highway is at an intersection with SR 69 at Myrtlewood.

Route description
SR 114 travels northeast through rural parts of Choctaw and Marengo counties. The highway travels through sections of Alabama’s Black Belt, one of the poorest regions of the state. It serves as a leg of the route between Butler and Linden and travels primarily through rural areas and unincorporated communities. The only incorporated towns the route traverses are Pennington and Myrtlewood.

History

The route was designated in 1963 along the former route of Choctaw County Route 32 (Choctaw CR 32).

Until 2000, the old Naheola Bridge on SR 114 near the unincorporated town of Naheola was one of only two bridges in the world where rail and road traffic shared the same surface. Traffic signals were mounted at either end of the bridge, controlled from the lift bridge operator stationed on top of the lift, that signaled to cars when it was safe to cross.

The bridge was closed to road traffic in 2000, and in 2001 the Highway Department constructed a new bridge for SR 114 parallel to the old Naheola Bridge.

Major intersections

See also

References

External links

 Pictures of the Naheola Bridge

114
Transportation in Choctaw County, Alabama
Transportation in Marengo County, Alabama